Barholm Rovers Football Club were a football team based in Creetown, Dumfries & Galloway. They were formed in 1884 and were original members of the Stewartry Football League based in Kirkcudbrightshire which started in 1894–95.

Rovers played their home games originally at Cassencarrie Park (now known as Castle Cary Park), but after 1894 they moved to Barholm Park in Creetown. Their stay in the Stewartry League was short-lived as they were replaced by the 6th Galloway Rifle Volunteers for the start of the 1896–97 season.

In 1900 Rovers amalgamated with Ellangowan Swifts but retained the name of Barholm Rovers. This new side were entered into the first round of the 1902–03 Scottish Cup. They were drawn away to Dundee, but they failed to honour the fixture and the Taysiders were awarded the tie by a walkover.

Rovers played in a number of colour combinations through their short history including black and white, black and amber stripes with navy shorts and eventually maroon.

The club folded in 1905 but were immediately replaced by a new club, Creetown Rifle Volunteers Football Club, a forerunner to the current South of Scotland Football League club, Creetown.

Notes

External links
 https://web.archive.org/web/20120312095023/http://www.statto.com/football/stats/scotland/fa-cup/1902-1903/results/r1

Defunct football clubs in Scotland
Association football clubs established in 1884
Association football clubs disestablished in 1905
1884 establishments in Scotland
1905 disestablishments in Scotland